The Children's Film Foundation (CFF) was a non-profit organisation which made films for children in the United Kingdom originally to be shown as part of children's Saturday morning matinée cinema programming. The films typically were about 55 minutes long.

History
The Foundation was formed in 1951 following the Wheare report that criticised the suitability of American programming for Saturday morning pictures. Mary Field was appointed chief executive. The Foundation was initially funded by the Eady Levy (a tax on box office receipts), receiving 5% of the Levy and the initial budget was £60,000 per year. The Foundation made around six films a year; most lasted less than an hour and were shot in less than two weeks.

The films featured future British stars including Leslie Ash, Keith Chegwin, Phil Collins, Michael Crawford, Phil Daniels, Dexter Fletcher, Sadie Frost, Susan George, David Hemmings, Frazer Hines, Gary Kemp, Richard O'Sullivan, Linda Robson, Pauline Quirke, Sally Thomsett, Dennis Waterman, Carol White, Jack Wild and Matthew Wright.

The films also include early films from British directors such as James Hill, Gerald Thomas, Don Chaffey, Lewis Gilbert and John Guillermin. It also used established directors such as Charles Frend and The Boy Who Turned Yellow (1972) was the last film production by Michael Powell and Emeric Pressburger.

Some of the films were critically recognized, winning awards at the Cannes Film Festival, Moscow Film Festival and Venice Film Festival.

The films were also popular on US TV and in 16mm showings in public libraries in Germany, Japan, Canada and South Africa.

By 1980, attendances for Saturday morning matinées were dwindling and the Foundation's annual funding was reduced from £530,000 a year to £330,000. The Eady Levy was abolished in 1985 and the Foundation made a few further films in the mid-1980s, by which time it had been renamed the Children's Film and Television Foundation. Its last production was Just Ask for Diamond in 1988. It made no films of its own after the mid-1980s, but it survived under its revised name, and in recent years has provided funding for other projects.

Many of its films, dating back to the 1960s, were shown on the BBC in the 1980s, in the Friday Film Special strand.

Frank Richard Wells (1903–82), second son of H. G. Wells and Amy Catherine Robbins, was a main executive at the CFF.

In 2012 The Children's Film and Television Foundation changed its name and broadened its role to become the Children's Media Foundation.

Its archive is now held at the BFI National Archive.

Selected filmography

 Bush Christmas (1947)
 The Stolen Plans (1953)
 The Dog and the Diamonds (1953)
 Soapbox Derby (1958)
 The Cat Gang (1958)
 The Salvage Gang (1958)
 The Adventures of Hal 5 (1958)
 Hunted in Holland (1960)
 The Last Rhino (1961)
 Go Kart Go (1963)
 Runaway Railway (1965)
 Cup Fever (1965)
 Calamity the Cow (1967)
 Cry Wolf (1968)
 Mr. Horatio Knibbles (1971)
 The Boy Who Turned Yellow (1972)
 Mauro the Gypsy (1972)
 Hide and Seek (1972)
 Paganini Strikes Again (1973)
 Professor Popper's Problem (1974)
 Robin Hood Junior (1975)
 The Firefighters (1975)
 The Man from Nowhere (1975):with Sarah Hollis Andrews and Ronald Adam
 One Hour to Zero (1976)
 Fern the Red Deer (1976)
 The Battle of Billy's Pond (1976)
 The Glitterball (1977)
 A Hitch in Time (1978)
 Sammy's Super T-Shirt (1978)
 4-D Special Agent (1981)
 Tightrope to Terror (1982)
 Friend or Foe (1982)
 Gabrielle and the Doodleman (1984)
 Haunters of The Deep (1984)
 Terry on the Fence (1985)
 Out of Darkness (1985)

Sources
 Rank Film Library 16 mm Catalogue, 1978, (pp183–193)

References

External links 
 The Children's Media Foundation website
 ScreenOnline entry for the CFF
 ScreenOnline entry looking at some of the CFF's work
 TV Cream's nearly complete listing of every CFF film
 The Children's Film Foundation at the BFI

 
British children's entertainment
Film organisations in the United Kingdom
1951 establishments in England
Organizations established in 1951
1985 disestablishments in England
Organisations based in the City of Westminster
Organizations disestablished in 1985
BAFTA Outstanding British Contribution to Cinema Award